Brinkerhoff Street Historic District is a national historic district located at Plattsburgh in Clinton County, New York. The residential district includes 13 contributing buildings. The district generally consists of one and one half / two story brick or frame residences built between 1845 and 1890.

It was added to the National Register of Historic Places in 1982.

References

Houses on the National Register of Historic Places in New York (state)
Historic districts on the National Register of Historic Places in New York (state)
Historic districts in Clinton County, New York
Houses in Clinton County, New York
National Register of Historic Places in Clinton County, New York